Kieran Lovell (born 16 May 1997) is a former professional Australian rules footballer who played for the Hawthorn Football Club in the Australian Football League (AFL).

Early career
Playing for the Kingborough Tigers in the TSL. With a strong 2015 season and winning the Tasmanian MVP and All-Australian Under-18 honours after impressive performances in the NAB AFL Under-18 Championships. With strong skills when it comes to the in and under ball he had been compared to former Hawthorn captain Sam Mitchell.

AFL career
Lovell made his senior debut for the Hawks against GWS Giants at Spotless Stadium in round 6, he had 6 kicks and 5 handballs when his team lost by 75 points. 

Lovell suffered a shoulder injury at the beginning of the 2017 season requiring surgery. He was able to return to senior football with Box Hill and helped them play in the finals.

On 24 September 2017, Lovell signed a one-year deal to remain at Hawthorn until the end of 2018, however after zero senior games in 2018, he was delisted.

Post AFL career
Before the 2019 TSL season Lovell returned to the Kingborough Football Club.

Statistics

|- style=background:#EAEAEA
| 2016 ||  || 36
| 2 || 0 || 0 || 16 || 13 || 29 || 4 || 1 || 0.0 || 0.0 || 8.0 || 6.5 || 14.5 || 2.0 || 0.5 || 0
|-
| 2017 ||  || 36
| 0 || — || — || — || — || — || — || — || — || — || — || — || — || — || — || 0
|- style=background:#EAEAEA
| 2018 ||  || 21
| 0 || — || — || — || — || — || — || — || — || — || — || — || — || — || — || 0
|- class="sortbottom"
! colspan=3| Career
! 2 !! 0 !! 0 !! 16 !! 13 !! 29 !! 4 !! 1 !! 0.0 !! 0.0 !! 8.0 !! 6.5 !! 14.5 !! 2.0 !! 0.5 !! 0
|}

Honours and achievements
Team
VFL premiership player: 2018

References

External links

Hawthorn Football Club players
1997 births
Living people
Australian rules footballers from Tasmania
Box Hill Football Club players
Kingborough Football Club players
Indigenous Australian players of Australian rules football